Chamissoa altissima, or false chaff flower, is native to North and South America. In Brazil it grows in the Cerrado vegetation.

See also
 List of plants of Cerrado vegetation of Brazil

Notes

Amaranthaceae
Flora of North America
Flora of South America
Flora of Brazil
Flora of the Cerrado
Flora of the United States